In probability theory and directional statistics, a wrapped exponential distribution is a wrapped probability distribution that results from the "wrapping" of the exponential distribution around the unit circle.

Definition 

The probability density function of the wrapped exponential distribution is

for  where  is the rate parameter of the unwrapped distribution. This is identical to the truncated distribution obtained by restricting observed values X from the exponential distribution with rate parameter λ to the range .

Characteristic function

The characteristic function of the wrapped exponential is just the characteristic function of the exponential function evaluated at integer arguments:

which yields an alternate expression for the wrapped exponential PDF in terms of the circular variable z=e i (θ-m) valid for all real θ and m:

where  is the Lerch transcendent function.

Circular moments
In terms of the circular variable  the circular moments of the wrapped exponential distribution are the characteristic function of the exponential distribution evaluated at integer arguments:

where  is some interval of length . The first moment is then the average value of z, also known as the mean resultant, or mean resultant vector:

The mean angle is

and the length of the mean resultant is
 

and the variance is then 1-R.

Characterisation
The wrapped exponential distribution is the maximum entropy probability distribution for distributions restricted to the range  for a fixed value of the expectation .

See also 

 Wrapped distribution
 Directional statistics

References 

Continuous distributions
Directional statistics